Armand de Las Cuevas (26 June 1968 – 2 August 2018) was a French racing cyclist.

He won prestigious races such as the Critérium du Dauphiné Libéré and the Clásica de San Sebastián. A time trial specialist, he won many prologues and individual time trials in the early 1990s. In both the 1992 and 1994 Tour de France he finished in the top 5 of the prologue as well as the other ITT's. He won a stage in the 1994 Giro d'Italia, an ITT, and placed in the top 5 of both other time trials. He also rode strongly enough to come in 9th on general classification. In the 1994 Tour de Romandie he won the prologue and finished 2nd overall.

He also competed in track pursuit racing, and was bronze medalist in the discipline at the 1990 UCI Track Cycling World Championships in Japan.
 
De Las Cuevas retired to Réunion in 1999, where he founded a cycling school. He committed suicide there in 2018.

Major results

1986 
 1st  Overall Tour de Lorraine
1987
 3rd Chrono des Herbiers
1988
 1st  Overall Tour de Bretagne
 4th Overall Circuit Cycliste Sarthe
 4th Chrono des Herbiers
1990
 1st Stage 4 Vuelta a Asturias
 3rd  Individual pursuit, UCI Track World Championships
1991
 1st  Road race, National Road Championships
 1st GP Ouest–France
 1st Stage 3 Bicicleta Vasca
 1st Bordeaux–Caudéran
 2nd Overall Circuit Cycliste Sarthe
1992
 4th Overall Tour de Romandie
1st Prologue
 6th Overall Tour de l'Oise
 9th Overall Circuit Cycliste Sarthe
1993
 1st  Overall Étoile de Bessèges
1st Stage 2
 1st Grand Prix des Nations
 3rd Grand Prix d'Ouverture La Marseillaise
 4th Overall Paris–Nice
1st Stage 7
1994
 1st  Overall Vuelta a Burgos
1st Stage 2
 1st Clásica de San Sebastián
 1st Paris–Camembert
 2nd Overall Tour de Romandie
1st Prologue
 2nd GP du canton d'Argovie
 5th Road race, National Road Championships
 6th Overall Giro del Trentino
 6th Overall Critérium International
 9th Overall Giro d'Italia
1st Stage 1b (ITT)
1995
 1st Trophée des Grimpeurs
 5th GP de la Ville de Rennes
 10th Overall Critérium International
1996
 10th Subida a Urkiola
1997
 1st Clásica de Sabiñánigo
 2nd Overall Volta a la Comunitat Valenciana
 3rd Overall Tour of Galicia
 6th Overall Volta a Catalunya
1998
 1st  Overall Critérium du Dauphiné Libéré
 1st  Overall Route du Sud
1st Stage 2
 9th Overall Volta ao Alentejo

Grand Tour general classification results timeline

References

External links

1968 births
2018 deaths
2018 suicides
French male cyclists
French Giro d'Italia stage winners
Sportspeople from Troyes
Sportspeople from Aube
Suicides in France